SMS Vineta was a protected cruiser of the , built for the German Imperial Navy (Kaiserliche Marine) in the 1890s. Vineta was laid down at the AG Vulcan shipyard in 1895, launched in April 1897, and commissioned into the Navy in July 1898.

Vineta served abroad in the American Station for the first several years of her career. While on station in the Americas, she participated in the Venezuela Crisis of 1902–1903 and bombarded several Venezuelan fortresses. She returned to Germany in 1905 and was used as a torpedo training ship in 1908. She was modernized in 1909–1911, after which she was used as a school ship for naval cadets. In November 1912, she participated in an international naval protest of the First Balkan War. At the outbreak of World War I, Vineta was mobilized into V Scouting Group, but served in front-line duty only briefly. She was used as a barracks ship after 1915, and ultimately sold for scrapping in 1920.

Design

In the early 1890s, elements in the German naval command structure grappled with what type of cruiser ought to be built to fulfill the various needs of the fleet. In the event, the RMA carried the day and three 6,000-ton cruisers were authorized in 1895. They resembled the larger s, designed at the same time, albeit at reduced scale. The new cruisers proved to be unsatisfactory as fleet cruisers, because they were too slow and they lacked sufficient armor protection. They nevertheless provided good service as overseas cruisers and later as training ships.

Her propulsion system consisted of three vertical 4-cylinder triple-expansion steam engines, each driving a single screw propeller, with steam provided by twelve coal-fired Dürr boilers. She had a crew of 31 officers and 446 enlisted men.

The ship was armed with a main battery of two  SK L/40 guns in single gun turrets, one forward and one aft. The guns were supplied with 58 rounds of ammunition each. Vineta also carried a secondary battery of eight  SK L/40 guns. Four were mounted in turrets amidships and the other four were placed in casemates, two abreast the conning tower and the others abreast the mainmast. She also carried ten  SK L/35 guns for defense against torpedo boats. The gun armament was rounded out by ten  Maxim machine cannon. She was also equipped with three  torpedo tubes with eight torpedoes, two launchers were mounted on the broadside and the third was in the bow, all below the waterline.

Her main and secondary battery turrets had 10 cm thick sides and the secondary casemates had the same level of protection. The conning tower had 15 cm thick sides.

Service history

She was launched on 9 December 1897, and  Friedrich von Hollmann gave a speech at the ceremony. After completing fitting-out work, which included installing facilities for a divisional staff, she was commissioned into the German navy on 13 September 1899. In April, KzS von der Groeben relieved Fonseca-Wollheim, but he then died of a stroke on 19 May before Vineta could embark on her first major cruise abroad. As a result, Fonseca-Wollheim resumed command of the vessel. The ship then moved to Kiel to make preparations for the cruise, which began with Vinetas departure from Kiel on 26 May, bound for South America.

American Station
The ship reached Saint Lucia in the Lesser Antilles on 14 June, where she joined the American Station, which had been disbanded for several years; the previous station ship, the unprotected cruiser , had been transferred away in 1898. Vineta then began a cruise along the coast of Venezuela and then through the Caribbean Sea. She visited New Orleans, United States, and then several ports in Mexico through January and February 1901 before returning to the Venezuelan coast. The ship arrived in Trinidad on 6 April, and from there, began a voyage south to visit the eastern coast of South America. In May, Vineta inspected Margarita Island off the coast of Venezuela for its potential as a naval base, but the Germans determined the port was insufficient for their purposes. The ship proceeded further southward, steaming as far as La Plata, Argentina, before returning north.

She arrived back in Venezuelan waters by 1 August, stopping in La Guaira. While there, she received orders to remain in the area to protect German nationals and business interests during the Thousand Days' War that involved Venezuela and Colombia. In addition to protecting Germans in the area, the deployment was intended as a show of force to compel the Venezuelan government to make reparations for grievances related to internal conflicts in the 1890s. On 6 October, two sailors from Vineta were arrested in Caracas, Venezuela, prompting the cruiser to send a landing party ashore in La Guaira to demand their release, which was quickly granted. Also that month, a German merchant vessel was fired upon off the coast of Venezuela; both of these incidents were resolved diplomatically. As the threat to German interests in the region proved to be less than expected, Vineta was sent to Newport News, United States, for periodic maintenance that lasted from 26 November to 17 December.

While Vineta was under repair, KzS Oskar Stiege arrived to replace Fonseca-Wollheim. During that period, the Germans left Falke and Stein in La Guaira, but at the end of the year, Stein and Moltke left for home, though they were replaced by the light cruiser , which arrived in February 1902. Vineta returned to Newport News for another overhaul from 19 May to 25 September. While the ship was in dry dock in June, Stiege fell ill and the ship's executive officer,  (Captain Lieutenant) Peter Lengerke, temporarily took command until KzS Georg Scheder arrived in August. After emerging from dry dock in September, Vineta steamed to Port-au-Prince, Haiti. Earlier that month, in the middle of the civil war, the German gunboat  had sunk the Haitian gunboat  over the Markomannia incident. Falke arrived later, allowing Vineta to return to Venezuelan waters.

Venezuelan crisis of 1902–1903

By this time, tensions between Venezuela and Britain, Germany, and Italy had risen significantly over measures that the Venezuelan president, Cipriano Castro, had imposed to try to suppress a rebellion, including a blockade of several coastal cities. Castro also suspended payments toward foreign debts. The German naval command instructed their ships in the region to free any German merchant vessels that were seized by the Venezuelan Navy by force if necessary. No incidents involving German ships materialized, however, but the European powers concluded an agreement on 1 December to put an end to the blockade.

On 7 December, the Europeans gave Castro an ultimatum, which he ignored. Scheder then began to seize or neutralize Venezuelan warships, along with the British protected cruiser  and the destroyer , which were placed under his command. The ships carried out operations against the Venezuelan Navy between 10 and 14 December. Scheder sent Gazelle to capture the gunboat  while Vineta responded to a request for assistance from the German consul in La Guaira. She and Retribution send landing parties ashore to defend the consulate and then to protect British nationals in the area. On the 13th, the British merchant ship  had been boarded and its crew arrested by Venezuelan forces. In response, the British protected cruiser  bombarded the forts at Puerto Cabello, and enlisted Vineta in the attack. The ships shelled the fortresses Libertador and Vigia, destroying both, before freeing Topaze and her crew. The brazenness of the Anglo-German attack on the port convinced Castro to order the release of all British and German nationals who had been arrested. 

Because Castro refused to give into German and British demands, those countries declared a blockade of the Venezuelan coast on 20 December, which Italy also joined. At that time, the Germans had at their disposal Vineta, Falke, Gazelle, Panther, Charlotte, Stosch, and Restaurador, which had been put in service with a German crew. The HAPAG steamer  served as the division's collier. By that time, the British Vice Admiral Archibald Douglas had arrived aboard his flagship, the protected cruiser ; as the most senior naval officer in the area, he relieved Scheder as the commander of the international squadron. On 4 January 1903, the German landing party was sent to occupy Puerto Cabello and seize the ships in the harbor.

On 17 January, Panther attacked Fort San Carlos in Maracaibo, but was repulsed after her bow  gun jammed and could not be returned to action; she could not maneuver in the confined waters to bring her other guns to bear. Vineta therefore was sent to silence the guns on 21 January. During the bombardment of the fort, Vineta fired a total of twenty 21 cm and eighty-six 15 cm shells, setting it afire and destroying the fortress. The Venezuelan gunners had already evacuated and suffered no casualties. The United States, which viewed itself as the protector of South America under the Monroe Doctrine, had initially ignored the European intervention but took an increasingly hostile view toward the Europeans as they became more aggressive, particularly after the attack on Fort San Carlos. The Europeans nevertheless requested the United States to arbitrate a settlement, which resulted in an agreement that Venezuela would receive all of the naval and civilian vessels that had been seized in return for resuming debt payments.

Subsequent activity

The East American Cruiser Division remained in existence after the conclusion of operations against Venezuela. Vineta embarked on a tour of ports in the West Indies, including Santo Domingo, Haiti, where civil unrest had broken out. At some point during this period, one of Vinetas 15 cm ammunition magazines exploded, but did not cause major damage to the ship. The accident had significant long-term consequences, however, as it exposed the volatility of German propellant charges. The Germans therefore reworked the composition of the propellant, which was in service by 1914. This new, more stable propellant saved several German battlecruisers from destruction when their magazines were penetrated by British shells during World War I. She then steamed north to Halifax, Canada, for another overhaul that lasted from 27 June to 2 September. The other vessels of the division also dispersed to other ports for repairs, before rendezvousing in Saint Thomas in October. While Vineta lay there on 15 November, KzS Ludwig von Schröder arrived to replace Scheder as the commander of both the vessel and the division.

Vineta cruised with the rest of the division through the West Indies in December 1903 and January 1904; this included a stop in New Orleans with the rest of the division in January. Vineta then visited Veracruz from 4 to 13 February before returning to various ports in the West Indies. She made another visit to New Orleans from 20 May to 11 July, during which time the ship was visited by President Theodore Roosevelt. Vineta next steamed to Charlotte Amalie, the capital of Saint Thomas. At that time, the island belonged to Denmark, but due to the country's weak economy, the Danish government was interested in selling Saint Thomas. Germany considered acquiring the island as a coaling station, but negotiations ultimately came to nothing. 

Vineta departed for a tour of the eastern coast of South America, stopping in several Brazilian ports before reaching Rio de Janeiro by October. While there on the 5th, Vineta received orders to cross the Atlantic to German South West Africa, which was then embroiled in a Herero rebellion against German colonial rule. The situation in the region was tense, as the neighboring Portuguese colony of Angola was delivering arms to the Herero rebels, and at the same time, the Russian Second Pacific Squadron had stopped to coal at Lüderitz Bay in German South West Africa, en route to its ultimate destruction at the Battle of Tsushima of the Russo-Japanese War. Vineta was not directly involved in any action in the colony, instead only assisting the steamer  in unloading soldiers, horses, and supplies, which had arrived on the night of 19–20 November. While she was in the area, Vineta was shadowed by the British cruiser  and the Portuguese gunboat . Vineta steamed north to Duala in the German colony of Kamerun in January 1905, where she received orders to return home. She arrived in Wilhelmshaven on 14 March, and the East American Cruiser Division was disbanded the following day.

Later career

Vineta was then assigned to the Torpedo Inspectorate on 30 March and was moved to Kiel, where she entered the  there for conversion into a torpedo test ship. While the work was being carried out, the ship's crew was reduced. On 3 January 1906, she returned to service with the Torpedo Testing Command, along with the light cruiser . The latter was initially the flagship of the unit, but Vineta replaced her in that role on 3 March. In June,  (KK—Corvette Captain) Eberhard von Mantey took command of the ship, though he served in the position for just a month before being replaced by KzS Schäfer. In 1907, the ship was used to test wireless telegraphy equipment from 21 March to 5 April. After completing the tests, she joined the ships of the Training and Testing Unit for a cruise to visit Vigo, Spain, that lasted from 15 April to 4 May. Vineta trained with the main fleet during its annual maneuvers, held from 25 August to 7 September; she served with the fleet's reconnaissance screen for the exercises. Vineta cruised with the Training and Testing Unit from 30 March to 25 April 1908. She then went into dry-dock for periodic maintenance from 6 July to 5 September, by which time the new armored cruiser  had replaced her in the Torpedo Testing Command. Vineta was accordingly decommissioned in Danzig.

The naval command then made the decision to convert Vineta into a training ship for naval cadets and apprentice seamen. The ship was re-boilered with Marine-type water-tube boilers. Vineta originally had three funnels, and during the modernization they were reduced to two. The refit was finished by early 1911, and Vineta was recommissioned for the third time on 29 March, under the command of KzS Karl Sievers. She embarked a contingent of naval cadets for a cruise to Norway that lasted from 7 June to 25 July, followed by a longer cruise back to the West Indies that began on 4 August and concluded with her return to Germany on 9 March 1912. After exchanging her cadets for another cohort for the 1912–1913 training year, she made a short cruise in July to visit Stockholm, Sweden, and Libau, Russia.

That year's long-distance cruise went to the Mediterranean Sea that year, and began on 6 August 1912. The ship cruised in the western Mediterranean later that year, along with her sister . The old cruiser Geier was also in the region. As the Bulgarian army was poised to march on Constantinople during the First Balkan War, the Great Powers deployed a naval force to ensure the safety of foreign nationals in the Ottoman Empire. Vineta and the battlecruiser  were sent to Constantinople as part of this force, Goeben arriving there on 15 November and Vineta joining her on 9 December. At that time, the Germans created the Mediterranean Division, which included both ships. The international fleet sent ashore a force of around 3,000 officers and men. The force was withdrawn to Crete after a ceasefire seemed imminent, but by February 1913 fighting again broke out, and the island was seized by Greece. In the meantime, Vineta had gone to Alexandria, Egypt, on 2 January, where she began the voyage back to Germany, arriving in Kiel on 5 March. FK Wilhelm Adelung relieved Sievers; he served as the ship's final captain. She took another group of cadets on a voyage in the Baltic Sea shortly thereafter.

On 11 August, Vineta began her last overseas cruise, again to South American and West Indian waters. Another period of domestic unrest had broken out in Haiti in January 1914, leading Vineta to steam to Port-au-Prince to protect German nationals in the city. There, she met the US dreadnought battleship  and the armored cruiser . All three ships sent landing parties ashore to protect their respective nationals. At that time, the Haitian president, Michel Oreste abdicated, and he and his family came aboard Vineta to be carried into exile. She later transferred Oreste and his family to the steamer , which took them to Colombia, where they went into exile. Vineta returned to Kiel on 16 March. She went on a tour of Swedish ports, including Stockholm, Visby, and Gothenburg, along with Glücksburg, Germany, over the summer of 1914, shortly before the outbreak of World War I. 

She was briefly mobilized into V Scouting Group, and from 27 August, was stationed in the western Baltic on patrol duty. She participated in a sweep eastward as far as Bornholm, but encountered no enemy vessels. Another sortie followed on 20 October, which advanced as far as Lyserort, Russia, but again, met no resistance from the Russian Baltic Fleet. By November 1914, the naval command decided to withdraw the ships from service, owing to their weak armor protection. Initially left unused in Kiel, she was reduced to a barracks ship for U-boat crews. She served in that capacity through the end of the war in November 1918. She was stricken from the naval register on 6 December 1919 and sold to ship breakers in Harburg. She was scrapped the following year.

See also
Vineta provisional, a famous stamp issued on SMS Vineta in 1901.

Notes

References

Further reading
 

 

Victoria Louise-class cruisers
Ships built in Danzig
1897 ships
World War I cruisers of Germany